Bulgaria elects on the national level a head of state—the president—and a legislature. The president is elected for a five-year term directly by the people. The National Assembly (Narodno Sabranie) has 240 members elected for a four-year term by proportional representation in multi-seat constituencies with a 4% threshold. Bulgaria has a multi-party system in which often no one party has a chance of gaining power alone and parties must work with each to form governments.

Parliamentary elections
Parliamentary elections have been held in Bulgaria since 1879. There was a period when partisan politics was banned from 1934 to 1944; in the wake of the Bulgarian coup d'état of 1934 and the sequential personal rule of Tsar Boris III. There was also period of single party system between 1945 and 1989, during the People's Republic of Bulgaria, during which only candidates sanctioned by authorities could run. This, in practice, gave the Bulgarian Communist Party and its collaborators a monopoly on power.

Until 1945 there was no universal suffrage for the women. The table below show the elections since 1990, when the government became a democratic republic.

All elections since 1991 have had 240 members, elected for a four-year term by proportional representation in multi-seat constituencies with a 4% threshold. The two elections that differed from this model was the 1990 Grand National Assembly election, where 400 representatives were elected: half by proportional representation and half by first-past-the-post voting. The other exception was the 2009 election when 209 representatives were elected by proportional representation and 31 through first past the post; seats corresponding to the provinces and the largest cities.

Recent elections

Presidential election 
Presidential elections have been held since 1992. From 1996 onwards, presidential elections have been held every five years.

European Parliament elections

Referendums 
Four nationwide referendums have been held in Bulgaria since it gained its De Facto independence in 1878:
 On 19 November 1922 the question was if criminals from the three previous wars were to be prosecuted;
 On 8 September 1946 the question was if Bulgaria was to remain a monarchy to become a republic;
 On 16 May 1971 the nation's approval of a new constitution was asked;
 On 27 January 2013 the question was if Bulgaria should develop its nuclear power by building a new nuclear power plant.
 On 25 October 2015 the question was if Bulgaria should introduce electronic voting.
 On 6 November 2016 voters were asked three questions. The questions were: Whether they supported limiting public funding of political parties; the introduction of compulsory voting in elections and referendums; and changing the electoral system for the National Assembly to the two-round system.

Several regional referendums have been held as well.

Local elections

Recent elections

See also 

 Electoral calendar
 Electoral system

References

External links
 Blog in English about the Bulgarian elections in 2009
 Adam Carr's Election Archive
 Ms Lyubka Savkova's Bulgarian Party Politics and Public Opinion Research Website hosted by the University of Sussex
 Parties and Elections
 Народно събрание на Република България/National Assembly of the Republic of Bulgaria 
 Bulgarian News Agency
 Blog in English about the Bulgarian elections in 2009
 NSD: European Election Database - Bulgaria publishes regional level election data; allows for comparisons of election results, 1990-2009